Carl Heinrich Theodor Knorr (15 May 1800 in Meerdorf near Braunschweig – 20 May 1875 in Heilbronn), was a German businessman and founder of food and beverage company Knorr.

References

1800 births
1875 deaths
People from Peine (district)
People from Brunswick-Lüneburg
German company founders
19th-century German businesspeople